Euan Holden (born 2 February 1988) is a Scottish-American former professional soccer player who played as a defender or midfielder.

Career
Holden began his career at the University of Connecticut, where he made 36 appearances and scored two goals in two seasons with the Huskies before transferring to the University of New Mexico, where he made 28 appearances and scored one goal in the last two seasons of his college career.  He also spent the summer of 2008 with Austin Aztex U23 in the USL Premier Development League.

On 14 January 2010, Holden was drafted in the fourth round (62nd overall) of the 2010 MLS SuperDraft by Houston Dynamo.

However, Holden elected to continue his career in Europe as he joined Danish sides Vejle and FC Hjørring before joining English club Stockport County in 2010 and then joined Bury in February 2013. He made his professional debut on 27 April 2013 in a 3–2 victory against Yeovil Town.

On 16 January 2014, Holden had his contract cancelled at Bury.

Personal life
Holden's brother Stuart is also a former professional footballer. In July 2018, Holden became the subject of a viral Twitter thread when his meeting of a woman on a plane was documented by a couple sitting in the row behind.

References

External links

1988 births
Living people
Scottish footballers
American soccer players
American expatriate soccer players
UConn Huskies men's soccer players
New Mexico Lobos men's soccer players
Austin Aztex U23 players
Vejle Boldklub players
Vendsyssel FF players
Stockport County F.C. players
Bury F.C. players
British emigrants to the United States
Expatriate men's footballers in Denmark
Houston Dynamo FC draft picks
USL League Two players
National League (English football) players
English Football League players
Association football midfielders
Scottish expatriate sportspeople in the United States
Expatriate soccer players in the United States
Scottish expatriate footballers
Association football defenders